Sveta Klara (English: Saint Clara) is a settlement in the southern part of Zagreb, Croatia. Once a separate village, it is now administered as a neighbourhood of the city district of Novi Zagreb – zapad. The population is 9,560 (as of Census 2011).

References

Neighbourhoods of Zagreb
Novi Zagreb